Ohne Pass in fremden Betten is an East German film. It was released in 1965.

External links
 

1965 films
East German films
1960s German-language films
1960s German films